The Spikers’ Turf Collegiate Conference was the 5th conference of the Spikers' Turf that started on July 30, 2016 and ended on September 10, 2016, games were held at the Ynares Sports Arena and PhilSports Arena. There were twelve (12) competing teams in this conference.

Preliminary Group A

|}

 All times are in Philippines Standard Time (UTC+08:00)

|}

Preliminary Group B

|}

|}

Final round
 All series are best-of-3

Third place 

|}

Championship 

|}

Awards

Most Valuable Player (Finals)
  Antony Paul Koyfman
Most Valuable Player (Conference)
  Marck Espejo
Best Setter
  Esmilzo Joner Polvoroza
Best  Outside Spikers
  Marck Espejo
  Raymark Woo

Best Middle Blockers
  Rafael del Pilar
  Kim Malabunga
Best Opposite Spiker
  Madzlan Gampong
Best Libero
  Lester Kim Sawal

Final standings

 Note: 
 (G) - Guest Player(c) - Team Captain(L) - Libero

References

Spikers' Turf
2016 in Philippine sport